Vanha-Espoo (Finnish) or Gamla Esbo (Swedish), literally "Old Espoo", is a largest main district of Espoo, a city in Finland. It covers part of a centre and northwest of a city.

It contains a districts Espoon keskus, Gumböle, Högnäs, Järvenperä, Karhusuo, Karvasmäki, Kaupunginkallio, Kolmperä, Kunnarla, Kuurinniitty, Muurala, Nupuri,  Nuuksio, Siikajärvi and Vanha-Nuuksio.

See also 

 Districts of Espoo

Districts of Espoo